Gérard Marie Robert Toulouse, born on 4 September 1939 in Vattetot-sur-Mer (Seine-Maritime), is a French theoretical physicist.

Diplomas and career 
Normalien, agrégé de physique, PhD in physics, research director at the CNRS, member of several French and foreign Academies, and notably founding member of the French Academy of Technologies (in 2000) and Corresponding Member of the French Academy of sciences.

Scientific work 
Gérard Toulouse is the author of various works in the field of theoretical physics: physics of condensed matter (magnetism, surfaces), magnetic impurity in a metal (Kondo effect): discovery of the Toulouse limit, exact results in the study of critical phenomena of phase transitions, topological classification of defects in ordered media, frustrated and disordered systems, spin glasses, neural networks and brain theories. Studies of cognition. Ethics of science and technology.

He won the 1983 Fernand Holweck Medal and Prize.

Personal Commitments 
In connection with his long-standing commitments (defence of human rights and international law, replacement of war by law, European construction), and his active participation in the emergence of the ethical movement in science and technology, he is notably a founding member of the Euroscience association (since 1997) and a member of the French association of the Pugwash movement (vice-president 1998-2010). Former member of the Standing Committee on Science & Ethics of ALLEA (Alliance of European Academies) from 1999 to 2010 (President between 2001 and 2006).

Co-founder and Secretary-General of the La Ferthé Foundation, hosted by the Fondation de France (1996). The La Ferthé Foundation is a member of the French Centre for Foundations (since its creation in 2003), and is active in several foundation networks (notably the family foundation network). Since autumn 2013, the position of Secretary General has been passed on to his niece Tessa Berthon.

The La Ferthé Foundation is active in the cultural, scientific, economic and social fields by providing support to encourage study and creation. Among other actions, the foundation awards a prize 'Knowledge and Courage', the first winners of which were Florence Hartmann and Philippe Videlier (1998), and the most recent winners Sarah Oppenheim (2012), Nicole Otto (2013) and Lila Lamrani (2015).

In 1993, the Lebanese physicist Rammal Rammal (1951-1991) created a prize in memory of his scientific godson, to honour eminent scientists from around the Mediterranean. Since 2000, the Rammal Award has been managed by the Euroscience association (based in Strasbourg) and its jury is European.

Member of the French National Commission for Unesco from 1997 to 2009, and President of its Natural Sciences Committee (1999-2009).

Episodic columnist (from 2003 to 2011) in the weekly features on Science & Ethics of the daily newspaper La Croix.

Books for the general public 

 Regards sur l'éthique des sciences, Hachette-Littératures, 1998.
 Les scientifiques et les droits de l'Homme, avec Lydie Koch-Miramond, Éditions de la Maison des sciences de l'homme, 2003.
 Quelle éthique pour les sciences ?, avec Guillemette de Véricourt, Collection 'Les Essentiels Milan', Éditions Milan, 2005.
 Sciences et Éthique. Chroniques (2003-2011), éditions Rue d'Ulm, 2016 [recueil de chroniques du journal La Croix]

References

1939 births
People from Seine-Maritime
French physicists
Members of the French Academy of Sciences
École Normale Supérieure alumni
Living people